"Will 2K" is the second single taken from American rapper Will Smith's second studio album, Willennium (1999). The single was released on November 8, 1999. Sampling instruments and lyrics from the chorus of the Clash's "Rock the Casbah," as well as bits from "Superrappin'" by Grandmaster Flash and the Furious Five, the song was co-written by Smith and produced by Trackmasters. The song features vocals from Cedric "K-Ci" Hailey of Jodeci and K-Ci & JoJo. "Will 2K" peaked at number two in the United Kingdom and pays homage to the new millennium.

Music video
The music video for "Will 2K" premiered in September 1999, at a total length of five minutes and two seconds. The video features Smith performing the song in a variety of settings, appearing in a series of musical eras and wearing costumes that reflect each epoch. DJ Jazzy Jeff, Eve, Tisha Campbell-Martin and then-husband Duane Martin, among others, make cameos in the video.

Track listings

 US 7-inch single
A. "Will 2K" (featuring K-Ci) – 3:56
B. "Will 2K" (instrumental featuring K-Ci) – 3:56

 US 12-inch single
 "Will 2K" (album version featuring K-Ci) – 3:56
 "Will 2K" (instrumental featuring K-Ci) – 3:56
 "Will 2K" (a cappella featuring K-Ci) – 3:56

 Australian CD single
 "Will 2K" (featuring K-Ci) – 3:56
 "So Fresh" (featuring Biz Markie and Slick Rick) – 4:27
 "Just Cruisin'" – 4:11
 "Miami" – 3:19

 UK CD1
 "Will 2K" (featuring K-Ci) – 3:56
 "Just Cruisin'" – 3:59
 "Miami" – 3:18

 UK CD2
 "Will 2K" (featuring K-Ci) – 3:56
 "So Fresh" (featuring Biz Markie and Slick Rick) – 4:27
 "Just the Two of Us" (Rodney Jerkins Remix featuring Brian McKnight) – 4:14

 UK cassette single and European CD single
 "Will 2K" (featuring K-Ci) – 3:56
 "So Fresh" (featuring Biz Markie and Slick Rick) – 4:27

Charts

Weekly charts

Year-end charts

Certifications

Release history

References

Will Smith songs
1999 singles
1999 songs
Columbia Records singles
New Year songs
Songs written by K-Ci
Songs written by Joe Strummer
Songs written by Mick Jones (The Clash)
Songs written by Paul Simonon
Songs written by Topper Headon
Songs written by Will Smith